The Turks and Caicos Islands passport is a British passport issued to British Overseas Territories citizens with a connection to the Turks and Caicos Islands.

Passport statement
Turks and Caicos Islands passports contain on their inside cover the following words in English:

Travel
British Overseas Territories Citizens with a connection to the Turks and Caicos Islands can enter the United States with a police certificate issued by the Turks and Caicos Islands for short business and pleasure. To qualify, they must not have had a criminal conviction or ineligibility, violated U.S. immigration laws in the past and must arrive in the United States and have the right to abode in the Turks and Caicos Islands. In addition to a valid, unexpired passport, all travellers 14 years of age or older with the old style passport must present a police certificate issued by the  Royal Turks and Caicos Islands Police Force within the past six months.

All British Overseas Territories citizens with a connection to the Turks and Caicos Islands must hold a British passport that is valid for more than six (6) months to travel to the United States.

See also 
 Visa requirements for British Overseas Territories Citizens

References

External links
Turks and Caicos Islands Government, Ministry of Border Control and Employment: Applying for a British Overseas Territory Citizen (Turks and Caicos Islands) Passport

Turks and Caicos Islands
British passports issued to British Overseas Territories Citizens
Passport